Danny van den Meiracker is a Dutch footballer who plays as a striker for IJsselmeervogels in the Dutch Tweede Divisie.

References

External links
 Voetbal International profile 

1989 births
Living people
Dutch footballers
Association football forwards
Eredivisie players
Eerste Divisie players
Tweede Divisie players
Derde Divisie players
SV Spakenburg players
NEC Nijmegen players
TOP Oss players
IJsselmeervogels players
People from Baarn
Footballers from Utrecht (province)